WEQX is an FM radio station located at 102.7 MHz and broadcasting from Manchester, Vermont, United States with an effective radiated power of 1,250 watts at 759 meters (equivalent to 50,000 watts at 150 meters). Their tower is located on nearby Equinox Mountain. Because of its location and power the station is able to reach Albany-Schenectady-Troy (while distantly), Saratoga Springs and Glens Falls along with southern and central Vermont, western Massachusetts, and western New Hampshire. It broadcasts an alternative rock format which is more varied than most stations owned by larger corporations.

Despite being located in Vermont, WEQX has been voted the best radio station for the Capital Region (Albany, New York) by the Metroland alternative newsweekly for 15 years running (up to 2006) and voted best radio station of 2002 and 2006 by the Albany Times Union. It has also won Best Radio Station of the Year awards from Rolling Stone magazine in 1993, 1995 and 1996. In addition, the Album Network (a radio industry magazine) voted the station the Best Alternative Radio Station in the Country (small market), in 1995.

History
WEQX was founded in November 1984 by Brooks Brown as an independent radio station, when he moved to Manchester and couldn't find a station to meet his advertising needs. Brown built the studio himself, and was involved in building the antenna. The station originally broadcast an Adult Contemporary format for its first ten months of operation until flipping to Alternative Rock or Modern Rock in September 1985. The station is located in a Victorian house at 161 Elm Street. Some of the DJs on WEQX in their early days as a Rock station included Ellen McKinnon formerly of WQBK-FM in Albany, NY as well as former WPYX Albany DJs Ernie James and John Clark.

WEQX, or "EQX", as it is commonly referred to by its listeners, is a large sponsor of live music and has presented various concerts in the Capital Region (Albany, New York).

In the summer of 2007, EQX held the first EQX Fest at the Saratoga Performing Arts Center. The concert started at 3 PM and ran until around midnight. It had three different stages; one for local bands, one for mainstream bands, and one for the headliners. The headliners included The Nightwatchman, Matisyahu, and 311 (in that order).

On September 28, 2013, EQX held its fourth annual Pearl Palooza in Albany, New York. It was an all day free music festival that featured Portugal. The Man, Said The Whale, Cayucas among others.

On November 14, 2014, WEQX celebrated its 30th anniversary as an independently owned-and-operated Alternative station, 1 year right after WEQX's founder and owner A. Brooks Brown died in August 2013.

On December 29, 2015 the WEQX transmitter tower collapsed due to ice and wind.  Broadcasting continued on their online feed, and reduced coverage was re-established with the use of a temporary tower a few days later.

References

External links

WEQX Stream Live
WEQX Tune In
Article on WEQX's 25th anniversary
Times-Union Story on Tower Collapse

EQX
Manchester, Vermont
Alternative rock radio stations in the United States
Radio stations established in 1984
1984 establishments in Vermont